The Presbyterian Church in Korea (BupTong) was formed in 1971 by Pastor Jun Seong-Soo. The  "BopTong is conservative in theology and strongly anti-communist". It has 34,000 members and 230 congregations. It accepts the Westminster Confession.

References 

Presbyterian denominations in Asia
Presbyterian denominations in South Korea